Memet Ali Alabora (born 25 November 1977) is a Turkish film and theatre actor. He is the son of actors Mustafa Alabora and Betül Arım.

Biography
The eldest child of a family of artists, Alabora's first performing experiences were in the plays The Matchmaker, Fiddler on the Roof, and West Side Story, which were performed in English by the theater branch of his school. In high school, Alabora also acted in plays by Shakespeare and Orhan Veli. In 1994, with support from his high school, Özel Boğaziçi Lisesi, Alabora founded a semi-professional theater.

His first professional acting position was in the play Acaba Hangisi?, performed at the Tiyatro Istanbul. At the same time, between 1995 and 1997, he worked as a reporter for the TV program A Takımı ("The A Team"), broadcast on ATV. Alabora also acted in the television series Kara Melek ("Black Angel") and played the lead role in Yılan Hikâyesi ("Snake Story"). In 1999, he played the lead role in the film Kayıkçı ("Boatman"), a Turkish-Greek joint production.

Alabora graduated from the Theater Department of the Istanbul University State Conservatory. He received his master's degree from Yıldız Technical University’s Faculty of Art and Design. Alabora is one of the founders of garajistanbul, a contemporary performing arts institution where he worked until May 2010. He is married to actress Pınar Öğün.

In 2011 he was awarded a Tarzan of Manisa award.

In 2012 he financed, starred in and directed Mi Minör.

Alabora is an activist in favor of civil rights and the environment; in 2013 he supported the Gezi protests.
Because of his support for the protests, and because of the way the media had shown clips of the Mi Minör play, Alabora and his teammates "felt it would be better to leave the country." They left and settled in  Cardiff, Wales

Stage
 1998 Hommage to Çiğdem Talu (Istanbul University State Conservatory)
 1998–2010 Acaba Hangisi? (Tiyatro İstanbul) - Vladi
 1999 Uzakta Piyano Sesleri (Piano Sounds From Distance) (İ.Ü. Devlet Konservaturarı) - Stanislavski
 2003–04 The Taming Of The Shrew (Istanbul City Theatre) - Petruchio
 2008 Hüsn-ü Aşk'a Dair (Istanbul State Opera and Ballet) - Narrator
 2008–10 Histanbul (garajistanbulpro) - Ali Bora
 2009–10 Muhabir (10+) - Memet Ali Alabora
 2012–13 Mi Minor (EEMPCM) - President
 2014 Gegen Die Wand (Theater Freiburg) - President

Filmography

Movies
 1999 Kayıkçı (Boatman) - Kayıkçı
 2003 Sır Çocukları Children Of Secret) - Reşo
 2004 Hababam Sınıfı Merhaba - Matkap Emre
 2005 Hababam Sınıfı Askerde - Matkap Emre
 2005 Ayın Karanlık Yüzü (Dark Side Of The Moon) - Yusuf
 2005 Maskeli Beşler İntikam Peşinde - Murat
 2005 Dondurmam Gaymak (I Scream, Ice Cream) - "Acting instructor"
 2006 Hababam Sınıfı 3,5 - Matkap Emre
 2006 Eve Dönüş (Homecoming) - Mustafa
 2008 Gölge (Shadow) - Şerif
 2009 Yedi Kocalı Hürmüz - Hüsrev (Doctor)
 2011 Entelköy Efeköy'e Karşı - Oyun Tasarımı

TV serials
 1996 Kara Melek (Black Angel) (Star TV) - Hakan
 1999 Yılan Hikayesi (Snake Story) (Kanal D) - Memoli
 2003 Canım Kocacım (My Dear Husband)(TRT 1) - Can Berke
 2004 Hayalet (Ghost) (Kanal D) - Sonat
 2006 Karınca Yuvası (Ant Farm) (Kanal D) - Engin
 2010 Heberler - Çeşitli 
 2013 Galip Derviş - Zafer Uzungöl
 2022 Four Lives as Sami Sak
 2022 The Serpent Queen as Sultan Suleiman I

Other works
 1995–1997 ATV A Team News Programme - Reporter
 2001–2003 Notada Yazmayanlar "Classical Music Programme" (Radyo Kozmos) - Together with Emir Gamsızoğlu producer and host
 2001 The Road To Eldorada- Tulio's voiceover
 2002–2007 Müjdat Gezen Sanat Merkezi (Mujdat Gezen Art Center) - Stage instructor
 2002–2008 Andante Magazine - Editor, writer - Shared column with pianist Emir Gamsızoğlu 
 2007–2010 garajistanbul - Board member, communications director
 2008 Çevre Bey - Çevre Bey's voiceover and model for the character
 2008 Goldberg Variations Journey (Classical Music Project) - Together with pianist Emir Gamsızoğlu design and host
 2009–2010 Notada Yazmayanlar for Children (İş Sanat) - Together with pianist Emir Gamsızoğlu design and host
 2010 Chopin's 200th Birthday, Cemal Reşit Rey Concert Hall, (Classical Music Project) - Together with pianist Emir Gamsızoğlu design and host
 2011 Oyuncular Sendikası (Union of Actors) - Chairman
 2012 Mi Minör - Director

References

External links

Living people
1977 births
Turkish male film actors
Turkish male television actors
Turkish male stage actors
Turkish human rights activists
Golden Butterfly Award winners
Male actors from Istanbul